Kilgobnet is one of 74 civil parishes in County Waterford, Ireland. Located within the Diocese of Waterford and Lismore, according to Samuel Lewis's Topographical Dictionary of Ireland, the parish had a population of approximately 3,000 inhabitants in 1837.

References

Civil parishes of County Waterford
Townlands of County Waterford